Kristen Tsai (born 11 July 1995) is a Taiwanese born Canadian badminton player. She is the women's doubles champion at the 2019 Pan American Games, fourth time Pan Am Champion winning the women's singles title in 2012, and then the women's doubles title in 2018, 2019, and 2021.

Career 
Tsai became the first Canadian ever to make in to the quarterfinals at the World Junior Championships. Lived in Vancouver, British Columbia, she trained at the ClearOne badminton club, and majored in criminology at the Simon Fraser University. She won her first Pan Am Championships title in 2012 in the women's singles event, and after that Tsai spent a full 4 years – between the 2013 and 2017 Canada Opens – away from international competition. In 2018, she competed at the Commonwealth Games in Gold Coast, Australia. She won gold medal at the Pan American Games in the women's doubles partnered with Rachel Honderich, and a silver medal in the mixed doubles with Nyl Yakura in 2019 Lima.

In 2021, she captured her fourth Pan Am Championships title by winning the women's doubles event partnered with Rachel Honderich.

In June 2021, Tsai was named to Canada's Olympic team.

Achievements

Pan American Games 
Women's doubles

Mixed doubles

Pan Am Championships 
Women's singles

Women's doubles

Mixed doubles

Pan Am Junior Championships 
Girls' doubles

BWF International Challenge/Series (7 titles, 5 runners-up) 
Women's singles

Women's doubles

Mixed doubles

  BWF International Challenge tournament
  BWF International Series tournament
  BWF Future Series tournament

References

External links 
 

1995 births
Living people
Sportspeople from Vancouver
Taiwanese emigrants to Canada
Canadian female badminton players
Badminton players at the 2020 Summer Olympics
Olympic badminton players of Canada
Badminton players at the 2018 Commonwealth Games
Badminton players at the 2022 Commonwealth Games
Commonwealth Games competitors for Canada
Badminton players at the 2019 Pan American Games
Pan American Games gold medalists for Canada
Pan American Games silver medalists for Canada
Pan American Games medalists in badminton
Medalists at the 2019 Pan American Games